The Enchanted Wanderer (Очарованный странник) is a 2002 Russian-language 'concert opera' by Rodion Shchedrin based on the novel The Enchanted Wanderer by Nikolai Leskov. It was commissioned by the New York Philharmonic for Lorin Maazel and first performed on 19 December 2002 in New York by the New York Philharmonic, New York Choral Artists, and Lorin Maazel.

Recordings
 Sergei Aleksashkin, Kristina Kapustinskaya & Evgeny Akimov Mariinsky Orchestra & Chorus, Valery Gergiev 2008

References

2002 operas
Russian-language operas
Operas by Rodion Shchedrin
Operas
Operas based on novels